Wil Sonpur railway station is  located in  Pakistan.

See also
 List of railway stations in Pakistan
 Pakistan Railways

References

External links

Railway stations in Sargodha District
Railway stations on Shorkot–Lalamusa Branch Line